The Scottish Junior Football East Region Central Division was a third-tier division of the East Region of the Scottish Junior Football Association.

The league came into existence under the 'Central' name for the 2006–07 season, although a 'Fife District league' had been in place below the East Super League since 2002–03, using the structure of a common 'East Region' top tier and lower regional divisions in place of the old structure of three separate regional leagues in that part of Scotland, with the Fife Junior Football League the historic local competition.

The Central Division was dissolved for the start of the 2013–14 season and member clubs were split between two expanded North and South divisions as part of a wider East Region league restructuring.

Final Members

Winners

As Fife District, one of three third-tier divisions:
2002–03: Kelty Hearts
2003–04: Thornton Hibs
2004–05: Hill of Beath Hawthorn
2005–06: Oakley United
As East Region Central, one of three third-tier divisions:
2006–07: Dundonald Bluebell
2007–08: Ballingry Rovers
2008–09: St Andrews United
2009–10: Thornton Hibs (2)
2010–11: Oakley United (2)
2011–12: Jeanfield Swifts
2012–13: Kinnoull

References

External links
 Central Division table at East Region SJFA
East Region Central Division at Non-League Scotland (archive version, 2007-08 membership)

3
2002 establishments in Scotland
Sports leagues disestablished in 2013
Sports leagues established in 2002
2013 disestablishments in Scotland
Football in Perth and Kinross
Football in Fife